Hilmar Þorbjörnsson (23 October 1934 – 29 January 1999) was an Icelandic sprinter. He competed in the 100 metres at the 1956 Summer Olympics and the 1960 Summer Olympics.

References

External links
 

1934 births
1999 deaths
Athletes (track and field) at the 1956 Summer Olympics
Athletes (track and field) at the 1960 Summer Olympics
Hilmar Thorbjornsson
Hilmar Thorbjornsson
Hilmar Thorbjornsson